The Rendille (also known as Rendille, Reendile, Rendili, Randali, Randile, and Randille) are a Cushitic-speaking ethnic group inhabiting the northern Eastern Province of Kenya.

Etymology
The ethnonym Rendille translates as "Holders of the Stick of God".

Overview
The Rendille are believed to have originally migrated down into the Great Lakes after splitting off from the Somali people in the Horn region, following a southward population expansions by the Oromo and the Somalis.

Traditionally, they are nomadic pastoralists, tending camels, sheep, goats and cattle. The camels are generally kept in the northern part of their territory and the cattle in the southern section. Additionally, the Rendille traditionally practice infibulation. This practice has it’s origins in Ancient Egypt which is well documented. Also, according to Grassivaro-Gallo and Viviani (1992), some believe the custom was first brought to the Horn region from the Arabian peninsula during antiquity, and was originally intended to protect shepherd girls from attacks by wild animals during menstruation. The tradition subsequently dispersed from there.

Also known as the ‘holders of the stick of God’, the Rendille community is formed by a group of camel herders who are also generally considered to be an indigenous community in Marsabit County. Based on their tribal tradition about their origin, the Rendille have no large-scale migration indicating that they have at one point migrated into their present tribal territory from somewhere else. In fact, each of the 9 clans that makes up the Rendille (with the exception of the odhola)  tell that they originally come from different localities all found within the present day tribal territory. For example, while the Rengumo clan believe that they originated form the western part onf Lake Turkana,  the Dubsahai and Adisoomele( the oldest clans of the seniority order) believe that they originated from Farre and Algas sites, located a few kilometres apart along the Kargi and Marsabit road. In addition, based on the great historical depth of other narrations such as early explorer’s accounts and colonial archives, indicates that the Rendille inhabited their present tribal territory for a very long time, prior to the arrival of all other groups. According to the Rendille the origin of the name Marsabit comes from the word 'Marsabicho', meaning a foggy place. However, the origin of the name Marsabit has also been contested especially by the Burji who believe that the name originated from a Burji word ‘Marsa-abet’ (meaning the house of Marsa).  However, based on the colonial archives,  the Burji's were first brought to Marsabit by the British government sometime in the 1920s. The first Burjis to be registered as Kenyan citizens were Ile Ume and Guba Nawe, in the year 1926.  Additionally, in contrary to the Rendille tribal traditions about their origin, and claims of indigeneity in Marsabit, the other widely told story of their origin is that they descended from Somali and were once Muslims. Despite being one of the most dominant theory of the  origin of the Rendille, it is also evident that this argument is only based on signs of the post-hoc explanation of their linguistic similarities with the Somalis. Indeed, according to Prof. Gunther Schlee, (an anthropologists with long experience working in the area), the reverse of these hypothesis can also be more true, and that for a fact, the Somali are descendants of the Proto-Somali who were very similar to the Rendille and may have been identical to the proto-Rendille (see Schlee 2014, 1975).

The first ethnological study of the Rendille was published at the turn of the 20th century by William A. Chanler. It described the unmixed Rendille that his party encountered as tall, slender and reddish-brown in complexion, with soft, straight hair and narrow facial features. Chanler additionally remarked that many of the Rendille possessed "fierce" blue eyes, a physical peculiarity that was also later noted by Augustus Henry Keane (1900), John Scott Keltie (1904) and John Henry Patterson (1909).

Distribution
According to Ethnologue, there were approximately 94,700 Rendille speakers in 2006. Most are concentrated in the Kaisut Desert and Mount Marsabit in the Marsabit District of Kenya's northern Eastern Province.

Language
The Rendille people speak the Rendille language as a mother tongue (also known as Rendile or Randile (as referred to mostly by their neighbours samburu)). They belong to the Cushitic branch of the Afroasiatic family. The Rendille language is closer to the Somali language than the rest of the Cushitic languages.

Additionally, some Rendille use English or Swahili as working languages for communication with other populations.

The Ariaal sub-group of the Rendille, who are of mixed Nilotic and Cushitic descent, speak the Eastern Nilotic Samburu language of the Samburu people with whom they cohabit.

Genetics
Recent advances in genetic analyses have helped shed some light on the ethnogenesis of the Rendille people. Genetic genealogy, although a novel tool that uses the genes of modern populations to trace their ethnic and geographic origins, has also helped clarify the possible background of the modern Rendille.

mtDNA
According to an mtDNA study by Castri et al. (2008), the maternal ancestry of the contemporary Rendille consists of a mixture of Afro-Asiatic-associated lineages and Sub-Saharan haplogroups, reflecting substantial female gene flow from neighboring Sub-Saharan populations. About 30% of the Rendille belonged to the West Eurasian haplogroups I (15%), N1a (8%), M1a (3%) and R0/pre-HV (3%). The remaining samples carried various Sub-Saharan macro-haplogroup L sub-clades, mainly consisting of L0a (22%) and L2a (8%).

Autosomal DNA
The Rendille's autosomal DNA has been examined in a comprehensive study by Tishkoff et al. (2009) on the genetic affiliations of various populations in Africa. According to Bayesian clustering analysis, the Rendille generally grouped with other Afroasiatic-speaking populations inhabiting the Great Lakes region, with these lacustrine groups forming a cluster distinct from that of the Afroasiatic-speaking populations in the Horn of Africa, North Africa and the Sahara. This difference was attributed to marked genetic exchanges between the Rendille and neighboring Nilo-Saharan and Bantu communities over the past 5,000 or so years.

Religion
In terms of creed, many Rendille practice a traditional religion centered on the worship of Waaq/Wakh. In the related Oromo culture and Somali Pre-Islamic culture, Waaq denotes the single god of the early pre-Abrahamic, monotheistic faith believed to have been adhered to by Cushitic groups.

Some Rendille have also adopted Islam or Christianity.

Subdivisions
According to Spencer (1973), the Rendille are organized into an age grade system of patrilineal lineage groups (keiya), which are subsumed under fifteen clans (group). Of those, only nine are considered authentic Rendille. These Northern Rendille or Rendille proper are consequently the only ones that are included in the traditional Rendille moiety (belesi). The remaining six clans that are excluded from the moiety consist of mixed individuals. Five of those clans are of Rendille (Cushitic) and Samburu (Nilotic) descent. Collectively, the latter hybrid groups are referred to as the Ariaal or Southern Rendille. The Somalis draw a distinction between the "original" or "good" ethnic Rendille (known as asil), and the "bad" or assimilated Rendille ("those who speak Samburu").

Notes

References

Ethnic groups in Kenya
Cushitic-speaking peoples